MS Noordam is a member of Holland America Line's Vista class, and the fourth Holland America Line vessel to bear the name. The ship was christened on February 22, 2006, in New York City by the actress Marlee Matlin. Noordam is a sister ship of MS Oosterdam, MS Westerdam, MS Zuiderdam and P&O Cruises' MS Arcadia (originally ordered by the HAL, but sold to P&O). The prefixes of the four ships' names represent the four directions of the compass in Dutch.

Design 

The ship is powered by a CODAG arrangement of five diesel generators (3 x 16,000 HP units, and 2 x 12,000 HP units) and one gas turbine (18,000 HP), for a total power output of approximately 62.6MW (84,000 HP). The power generated is used both for propulsion, via two 17.5MW (23,467 HP) ABB Azipods, and the ship's "hotel load," which includes HVAC and freshwater production. She is capable of producing 1,700 tons (450,000 gallons) of fresh water daily via desalinization, although average consumption is only around 750 tons/day (200,000 gallons). The ship consumes approximately 216 tons/day (57,000 U.S. gallons) of heavy fuel oil, and 90 tons/day (23,000 U.S. gallons) of marine gas oil, at peak power production.

References

External links
Official website

Ships of the Holland America Line
Ships built by Fincantieri
Panamax cruise ships
Ships built in Venice
2005 ships